Hyperreligiosity is a psychiatric disturbance in which a person experiences intense religious beliefs or episodes that interfere with normal functioning.  Hyperreligiosity generally includes abnormal beliefs and a focus on religious content or even atheistic content, which interferes with work and social functioning.  Hyperreligiosity may occur in a variety of disorders including epilepsy, psychotic disorders and frontotemporal lobar degeneration. Hyperreligiosity is a symptom of Geschwind syndrome, which is associated with temporal lobe epilepsy.

Signs and symptoms

Hyperreligiosity is characterized by an increased tendency to report supernatural or mystical experiences, spiritual delusions, rigid legalistic thoughts, and extravagant expression of piety. Hyperreligiosity may also include religious hallucinations. Hyperreligiosity can also be expressed as intense atheistic beliefs.

Pathophysiology and cause

Hyperreligiosity may be associated with epilepsy – in particular temporal lobe epilepsy involving complex partial seizures – mania, frontotemporal lobar degeneration, Anti-NMDA receptor encephalitis, hallucinogen related psychosis and psychotic disorder. In persons with epilepsy episodic hyperreligosity may occur during seizures or postictally, but is usually a chronic personality feature that occurs interictally.  Hyperreligiosity was associated in one small study with decreased right hippocampal volume. Increased activity in the left temporal regions has been associated with hyperreligiosity in psychotic disorders.  Pharmacological evidence points towards dysfunction in the ventral dopaminergic pathway.

Treatment
Epilepsy related cases may respond to antiepileptics.

References

External links 

Psychosis
Religion and mental health